Harold Crow may refer to:

Harold Finch (Person of Interest), who used the alias Harold Crow
Chief Harold Crow of Pauingassi First Nation